Falling Water, also known as Aquamobile, is an outdoor 1972 sculpture and fountain by Lin Emery, installed outside the Bank of Oklahoma building (201 Robert S. Kerr Avenue) in Oklahoma City, in the U.S. state of Oklahoma.

Description

The abstract and kinetic metal sculpture rests in a fountain with a stone basin. The basin's east side has holes which originally supported "Fidelity Bank" lettering.

History
The artwork was dedicated on January 28, 1972. It was surveyed as part of the Smithsonian Institution's "Save Outdoor Sculpture!" program in 1994.

See also
 1972 in art

References

1972 establishments in Oklahoma
1972 sculptures
Abstract sculptures in the United States
Fountains in Oklahoma
Kinetic sculptures in the United States
Metal sculptures
Outdoor sculptures in Oklahoma City
Stone sculptures in the United States
Water in art